Kelumapusaura (meaning "red earth lizard") is a genus of saurolophine hadrosaur from the Late Cretaceous Allen Formation in what is now Patagonia in Argentina. The type and only species is K. machi, known from a bonebed of various individuals.

Etymology
The generic name, "Kelumapusaura," combines "kelumapu," the Mapudungun word for "red earth," and the feminine form of the Greek "sauros," meaning "lizard." The specific name, "machi," is derived from a word from the Mapuche people for "shaman."

Description

Phylogeny
Depicted below is a reproduction of the phylogenetic tree produced by Rozadilla et al. (2022), including Kelumapusaura and Huallasaurus, which was described in the same study.

Paleoecology
Kelumapusaura is known from the Late Cretaceous Allen Formation of Río Negro Province, Argentina. Many other dinosaurs, including titanosaurs, hadrosaurids, abelisaurids, dromaeosaurids, and alvarezsaurids have been named from the formation.

References

Saurolophines
Maastrichtian life
Late Cretaceous dinosaurs of South America
Cretaceous Argentina
Fossils of Argentina
Allen Formation
Fossil taxa described in 2022